The Orman Garden is one of the most famous Botanical gardens in Egypt. It is located at Giza, in Cairo. It dates back to 1875 and the reign of Khedive Isma'il Pasha who established the garden on a larger site than it presently occupies as part of the Palace of the Khedive. A great lover of gardens, the Khedive entrusted the design of the garden to the French landscaper Jean-Pierre Barillet-Deschamps. It became a public botanical garden in 1910/1917 and put under the Ministry of Agriculture management.

The garden covers about 28 acres. Today, the garden contains  a rock garden, a rose garden, cactus gardens, and probably the most notable feature, the lotus pond.

Orman Garden is located west of the River Nile and east of Cairo University in the Giza Governorate. “Orman” is a Turkish word, which means “the forest”. 

A small botanical museum attached to the garden shelters herbaria dating from the Ismail khedive and furniture from the king Farouk.

Spring Festival
Since 1920, the Orman Garden has hosted an annual spring floral exhibition. The Spring Festival usually starts in March every year and is an important Egyptian cultural event in spring. In 2021, it started on March 13. Officials from the ministry of agriculture open the exhibition. The spring fair usually lasts a month. During that time, many companies exhibit their various plant offerings including ornamental plants, cut flowers, cactus, seeds for growing many plants, fertilizers, gardening tools, and pots. In addition, local goods like woven baskets, Aswanian honey, essential oils, souvenirs, and jewelry can also be found at the exhibition. Prices for plants start from as low as 5 LE and rare varieties can reach thousands. Huge plant producers like Egypt Green (Safwat Habib) and sellers of clay pots from the Fustat Souq in Old Cairo participate in the exhibition.

Special Collections

Conifers, palms, cacti, succulents, roses, bamboo, ficus, aquatic plants, strelitzia
 Acacia nilotica  wildex Delile, Tree
 Albizia lebbeck  Benth,  Tree
 Balanites aegyptiaca Pelile, Tree
 Cyperus papyrus Plant aquatic
 Hyphaene thebaica  Mart. , Palm
 Luffa aegyptiaca  Auth , Climber

Orman Garden has a seed bank and publishes it own Index Seminum.

Gallery

References

Botanical gardens in Egypt
Buildings and structures in Giza
Cactus gardens